The Ethics & Religious Liberty Commission (ERLC) is the public policy arm of the Southern Baptist Convention, the second-largest Christian denomination in the United States, with over 16 million members in over 43,000 independent churches. President Russell D. Moore left office on June 1, 2021. Brent Leatherwood was unanimously voted in by the board of trustees to be the next ERLC president on Sept. 13, 2022 . The commission is headquartered in Nashville, Tennessee, with additional offices in Washington, D.C. and Cyprus.

History 

Formerly known as the Christian Life Commission (1953-1997), the entity with organizational predecessors dating back to 1907 received its current name in the course of a broad reorganization of multiple Southern Baptist entities in 1997 (Sutton, p 335).  The Southern Baptist Convention  terminated its participation with the Baptist Joint Committee for Religious Liberty in 1992 (Sutton, p. 300) due to conflicts over separation of church and state and whether Baptist organizations should play a role in partisan politics. It was led by Richard Land from 1988 to 2013. Land announced his intention to retire effective October 23, 2013, after the uproar that ensued from his controversial comments about the Trayvon Martin case that resulted in an official reprimand by the ERLC's executive committee. Russell D. Moore filled the post afterwards. Moore is an outspoken critic of then-Republican Presidential candidate, Donald Trump. His criticism of Trump has been controversial with several Southern Baptist leaders.

The stated vision of the ERLC is an organization "dedicated to engaging the culture with the gospel of Jesus Christ and speaking to issues in the public square for the protection of religious liberty and human flourishing. Our vision can be summed up in three words: kingdom, culture and mission. Since its inception, the ERLC has been defined around a holistic vision of the kingdom of God, leading the culture to change within the church itself and then as the church addresses the world."

At the Convention's 2018 annual meeting, a motion to defund the ERLC was rejected.

Activities 
The agency has many ministries to carry out its stated missions, including voter registration, a think tank called the Research Institute, and the Psalm 139 Project, which donates sonogram machines to crisis pregnancy centers.

ERLC is involved in legislative advocacy. Its achievements include:
 The Victims of Trafficking and Violence Protection Act of 2000 (TVPA)
 The Sudan Peace Act of 2002
 The Prison Rape Elimination Act of 2003 (PREA)
 The North Korean Human Rights Act of 2004

The ERLC campaigned unsuccessfully against the 2022 passage of the Respect for Marriage Act, arguing that its gender-neutral definition of marriage contradicted the Bible, and claiming that it is a threat to religious freedom.

Leadership history

See also
 Southern Baptist Convention conservative resurgence

References

External links 
 

Baptist organizations established in the 20th century
Southern Baptist Convention